Engolasters is a village in Andorra, located in the parish of Escaldes-Engordany. It is located approximately 2 kilometres east of the capital Andorra la Vella.

Populated places in Andorra
Escaldes-Engordany